Newcomer is a 1977 Soviet drama film directed by Valeriy Lonskoy.

Plot 
The film tells about the love of the village driver Fyodor for the teacher Mariya, who, together with her daughter, visits his village. They begin to live together. Everything was fine with them, until her ex-husband arrived in the village.

Cast 
 Zhanna Prokhorenko as Mariya Nesterova
 Yelena Ikonitskaya as Katya
 Aleksandr Mikhaylov as Fyodor Barinev (as A. Mikhaylov)
 Sergei Ponachevny as Semyon Arsentevich Barinev (as S. Ponachevnij)
 Yelena Kuzmina as Klavdiya Barineva (as Ye. Kuzmina)
 Mariya Skvortsova as Anisya Borisova (as M. Skvortsova)
 Sergei Torkachevsky as Vanya 'Kochetok' (as S. Torkachevsky)
 Lev Borisov as Yakov Silin (as L. Borisov)
 Mariya Vinogradova as Sasha (as M. Vinogragodova)
 Vladimir Zemlyanikin as Stepan Shokhin

References

External links 
 

1977 films
1970s Russian-language films
Soviet drama films
1977 drama films